Maxwelton is an unincorporated community located on the south end of Whidbey Island, Washington.

A post office called Maxwelton was established in 1908, and remained in operation until 1924. The community was named after Maxwelltown, in Scotland.

References

Unincorporated communities in Island County, Washington
Unincorporated communities in Washington (state)